SBMA may refer to:

 Santa Barbara Museum of Art
 Spinal and bulbar muscular atrophy
 Subic Bay Metropolitan Authority